Nam-sun, also spelled Nam-soon, is a Korean unisex given name. Its meaning depends on the hanja used to write each syllable of the name. There are five hanja with the reading "nam" and 31 hanja with the reading "sun" on the South Korean government's official list of hanja which may be used in given names. 

People with this name include:
Paek Nam-sun (1929–2007), North Korean male politician
Lee Nam-sun (born 1961), South Korean female speed skater
Kim Nam-soon (born 1980), South Korean female archer

Fictional characters with this name include:
Nam-soon, male character in 2011 South Korean film Pained
Go Nam-soon, male character in 2013 South Korean television series School 2013

See also
List of Korean given names

References

Korean unisex given names